The A Line is one of seven RapidRide lines (routes with some bus rapid transit features) operated by King County Metro in King County, Washington. The A Line began service on October 2, 2010, running from Tukwila to Federal Way, mostly along Pacific Highway South. The northern terminus is Tukwila/International Boulevard Station. From there, riders can transfer to Sound Transit's Link light rail, the RapidRide F Line, or to other King County Metro buses that serve Burien, Tukwila, SeaTac, Georgetown, SoDo, and downtown Seattle. Its southern terminus is Federal Way Transit Center and connects riders to buses serving Tacoma, Pierce County, and Auburn.  Between the termini there are a total of 13 stations plus 13 intermediate stops.

History
This corridor was previously served by King County Metro route 174 which carried an average of 5,570 riders on weekdays during the last month in service. Since the implementation of RapidRide on the corridor, ridership has grown 81 percent and the A Line served an average of 10,100 riders on weekdays in spring 2015.

Service

Between 10:00 pm and 4:15 am, service operates on a schedule; all other times are estimated headways.

References

External links
A Line website
RapidRide website
RapidRide Blog
King County Metro
Prototype bus photo sets on Flickr
From Oran Viriyincy
From user Citywalker
From usermajinandoru

Bus transportation in Washington (state)
Transportation in King County, Washington
Transportation in Seattle
2010 establishments in Washington (state)
2010 in transport
King County Metro